The Museum of Modern Art in Caracas (Spanish: Museo de Arte Moderno de Caracas) was a proposed art museum in Caracas, Venezuela. It was designed in the form of an inverted pyramid, and proposed to be placed on a cliff in the neighborhood of Colinas de Bello Monte high above the Central Zone of Caracas. The proposed structure would be entirely opaque without a visual connection to its surroundings from the interior; natural light would only enter the building via a glass ceiling. It was designed between 1954 and 1955 by Oscar Niemeyer and never realized.

References

Unbuilt buildings and structures
Architecture in Venezuela
Oscar Niemeyer buildings
Inverted pyramids